Ångström is a small lunar impact crater located on the border between Oceanus Procellarum to the west and Mare Imbrium to the east. To the south is a formation of mountains rising out of the mare named the Montes Harbinger. To the east are some wrinkle ridges named the Dorsum Bucher and Dorsa Argand. This crater is bowl-shaped, with a circular rim and inner walls that slope down to the small central floor. It has a higher albedo than the surrounding maria. The crater halo is radar dark, indicating a lack of larger blocks among the fine ejecta.

Ångström crater is named after Anders Jonas Ångström, a Swedish physicist and one of the founders of the science of spectroscopy.

Satellite craters
By convention these features are identified on lunar maps by placing the letter on the side of the crater midpoint that is closest to Ångström.

References

Sources

External links
 
 LTO-39A2 Angstrom — detailed USGS topographic map of crater and vicinity


Impact craters on the Moon